The Wasdale Horseshoe is a group of hills on the eastern fringe of the English Lake District, to the west of the A6, south of Shap, Cumbria. They surround the valley of Wasdale Beck, a tributary of Birk Beck and ultimately of the River Lune. The horseshoe is the subject of a chapter of Wainwright's book The Outlying Fells of Lakeland. This Wasdale should not be confused with the better known Wasdale, containing Wast Water, on the west of the Lake District.

Wasdale Pike is within the Shap Fells Site of Special Scientific Interest.

References

External links

 

Fells of the Lake District